The  Washington Redskins season was the franchise's 68th season in the National Football League (NFL) and their 63rd in Washington, D.C. The team improved on their 6–10 record from 1998 to go 10–6. They succeeded to the extent of reaching their first postseason since 1992 and beating the Lions in the first week of the playoffs; as of 2020, this is Washington's most recent home playoff win. 

Their season would end after losing to the Buccaneers by a single point in the divisional playoff round. The season would also be the first full season for new team owner Daniel Snyder, who purchased the team prior to the start of the season from Jack Kent Cooke's estate, and under whose ownership the team would decline. It would be the fourth and final season that the Redskins qualified for the playoffs in the 1990s and for the next five seasons, the team fell out of contention. They returned to the playoffs in 2005, where they would again win a Wild Card playoff game, one of only two playoff game wins under 23 years of Snyder's ownership.

Offseason

NFL Draft 

The New Orleans Saints traded all of their draft picks to the Washington Redskins for the fifth overall selection, which they used to take running back Ricky Williams. It is the first time ever that an NFL team has had only one pick in a draft.

Personnel

Staff

Roster

Regular season

Schedule

Standings

Playoffs

NFC Wild Card Game

NFC Divisional Game 
Tampa Bay Buccaneers 14 Washington Redskins 13

Saturday Jan 15, 2000

Start Time: 4:15pm

Stadium: Raymond James Stadium

Attendance: 65,835

The Redskins took a 13 - 0 lead with a field goal in the 2nd quarter, a 100 yard kickoff return for a touchdown by Brian Mitchell in the 3rd, and a second field goal by Brett Conway in the 3rd. The Buccaneers came back late in second half with a 2 yard touchdown run by Mike Alstott and a 1 yard touchdown pass from Shaun King to John Davis. The Redskins had an opportunity to win the game with a field goal as time expired, but the snap was botched.

References

External links 
 1999 Washington Redskins at Pro-Football-Reference.com

Washington
Washington Redskins seasons
NFC East championship seasons
Red